Welham Junction was a railway junction named after the village of Welham, Leicestershire, although the junction itself lay within the parish of Weston by Welland, Northamptonshire. It was the junction where the line from  split, with one route heading eastwards towards  and one north towards Nottingham. Just to the east was Ashley and Weston railway station, and to the north was Hallaton railway station.

References

Rail transport in Northamptonshire
London and North Western Railway
Great Northern Railway (Great Britain)